Mike Kouwenhoven (born February 7, 1959) is a Canadian-born Dutch former professional ice hockey player.

Kouwenhoven competed as a member of the Netherlands men's national ice hockey team at the 1981 World Ice Hockey Championships.

References

1959 births
Living people
Billings Bighorns players
Calgary Canucks players
Dutch ice hockey left wingers
Canadian people of Dutch descent
Heerenveen Flyers players
Houston Apollos players
Montana Magic players
Ice hockey people from Calgary
Western International Hockey League players
Wichita Wind players